Alexandrovskoye is a rural locality (a selo) and the administrative center of Alexandrovsky District of Tomsk Oblast, Russia, located on the Ob River. Population:

Climate
Alexandrovskoye has a subarctic climate (Köppen climate classification Dfc), with long, severely cold winters and short, warm summers. Precipitation is moderate and is somewhat higher in summer than at other times of the year.

References

Rural localities in Tomsk Oblast
Renamed localities of Tomsk Oblast